Wong Kwok-kin, BBS (黃國健; Yale: Wòhng Gwok Gihn; born May 1952) is a former member of the Legislative Council of Hong Kong representing the Kowloon East constituency, and a former non-official member of the Executive Council of Hong Kong appointed by Carrie Lam in 2017.

Wong is the former Chairman of the Hong Kong Federation of Trade Unions (HKFTU) and a member of the Democratic Alliance for the Betterment and Progress of Hong Kong. He is one of Hong Kong's deputies to the National People's Congress of the People's Republic of China.

Wong led HKFTU team to participate in the 2008 Hong Kong legislative election, followed by Chan Yuen Han, a former veteran legislator. Wong won the seat while Chan lost.

References

1952 births
Delegates to the 10th National People's Congress from Hong Kong
Delegates to the 11th National People's Congress from Hong Kong
Hong Kong Federation of Trade Unions
Living people
Hong Kong trade unionists
Democratic Alliance for the Betterment and Progress of Hong Kong politicians
HK LegCo Members 2008–2012
HK LegCo Members 2012–2016
HK LegCo Members 2016–2021
Members of the Executive Council of Hong Kong